Pipe Spring National Monument is a United States National Monument located in the U.S. state of Arizona, rich with American Indian, early explorer, and Mormon pioneer history. Administered by the National Park Service, Pipe Spring was listed on the National Register of Historic Places on October 15, 1966, and the boundaries of the Pipe Spring National Monument Historic District (a portion of the monument) were expanded in October 2000.

History
The water of Pipe Spring has made it possible for plants, animals, and people to live in this dry desert region. Ancestral Puebloans and Kaibab Paiute Indians gathered grass seeds, hunted animals, and raised crops near the springs for at least 1,000 years.

Antonio Armijo discovered the springs when he passed through the area in 1829, when he established by the Armijo Route of the Old Spanish Trail.

Pipe Spring was named by the 1858 Latter-day Saint missionary expedition to the Hopi mesas led by Jacob Hamblin.  In the 1860s Mormon pioneers from St. George, Utah, led by James M. Whitmore brought cattle to the area, and a large cattle ranching operation was established.  In 1866 the Apache, Navajo and Paiute tribes of the region joined the Utes for the Black Hawk War, and, after they raided Pipe Spring, a protective fort was constructed by 1872 over the main spring. The following year the fort and ranch was purchased by Brigham Young for the Church of Jesus Christ of Latter-day Saints (LDS Church).  The LDS Bishop of nearby Grafton, Utah, Anson Perry Winsor, was hired to operate the ranch and maintain the fort, soon called Winsor Castle.  This isolated outpost served as a way station for people traveling across the Arizona Strip, that part of Arizona separated from the rest of the state by the Grand Canyon. It also served as a refuge for polygamist wives during the 1880s and 1890s.  The LDS Church lost ownership of the property through penalties involved in the federal Edmunds-Tucker Act of 1887.

Although their way of life was greatly impacted by Mormon settlement, the Paiute Indians continued to live in the area and by 1907 the Kaibab Paiute Indian Reservation was established, surrounding the privately owned Pipe Spring ranch.  In 1923, the Pipe Spring ranch was purchased and set aside as a national monument to be a memorial to western pioneer life.

The site today
Today the Pipe Spring National Monument, Kaibab Band of Paiute Indians Visitor Center, and Museum explain the human history of the area over time. Daily tours of Winsor Castle, summer "living history" demonstrations, an orchard and garden, and a half-mile trail offer a glimpse of American Indian and pioneer life in the Old West.  The Paiute tribe runs a small adjoining campground.

Climate
Pipe Spring National Monument has a semi-arid climate (Köppen: BSk) with cold winters and hot summers.

See also

 List of national monuments of the United States
 Ella Stewart Udall
 The Church of Jesus Christ of Latter-day Saints in Arizona

References

External links

 
 Pipe Spring National Monument – official site
 
 Pipe Spring National Monument: An Administrative History
 Encounter on the High Desert Documentary produced by KUED

1923 establishments in Arizona
Apache Wars
Old Spanish Trail (trade route)
Archaeological sites in Arizona
Historic districts on the National Register of Historic Places in Arizona
Fortified houses
Forts in Arizona
Historic house museums in Arizona
History museums in Arizona
History of the Church of Jesus Christ of Latter-day Saints
The Church of Jesus Christ of Latter-day Saints in Arizona
Military and war museums in Arizona
Museums in Mohave County, Arizona
National Park Service National Monuments in Arizona
Native American museums in Arizona
Protected areas established in 1923
Protected areas of Mohave County, Arizona
Historic American Buildings Survey in Arizona
National Register of Historic Places in Mohave County, Arizona
Springs of Arizona